Eugnosta parreyssiana is a species of moth of the  family Tortricidae. It is found in France, Germany, Austria, Switzerland, the Czech Republic, Slovakia, Romania and Russia.

The larvae possibly feed on Jurinea cyanoides.

Taxonomy
The species was treated as a synonym or subspecies of Eugnosta hydrargyrana, but was given species rank by Nedoshivina in 2007.

References

Moths described in 1842
Eugnosta